Sinespace is a free-to-play massively multiplayer online Unity 3D-based platform created and published by Sine Wave Entertainment. It enables users to create and sell 3D content and interact with others as 3D avatars. It was beta launched in November 2016  and teamed up with Unity to make its SDK available in the Unity Asset Store in March 2019. It supports Oculus Rift, HTC Vive and Windows Mixed Reality headsets, but is also accessible through PC, Mac, Linux, and Chrome web browsers.

Usage 
Sinespace's usage is similar to that of multiplayer virtual worlds. Players can create and customize their own 3D worlds and 3D content such as vehicles, mini-games, avatar clothing and gestures, and sell them for real world money. Players can also customize the shape and appearance of their avatar and buy avatars from third party developers such as Daz 3D. Content is created through a Unity 3D-compatible SDK, and in-game through building tools.

Enterprise 
Sinespace also has private, white-labeled grids for enterprise use. Customers include the U.S. Department of Defense, Pearson Education, Virgin Group, the Smithsonian, the University of Edinburgh, Michigan State University, and other organizations.

Events 
Sinespace has hosted several in-world talk shows featuring live audiences of avatars with notable people in the arts and technology, who also appear in avatar form, including video game designer Warren Spector, VR pioneer Jaron Lanier, MMO pioneer Richard Bartle, and Hugh Welchman, producer of the Oscar-nominated animated feature Loving Vincent.

Developer 
Sinespace's lead developer is Adam Frisby, who was also a key developer of the open source virtual world OpenSimulator. Frisby additionally created a company that earned seven figures in real money by selling content in Second Life. Sinespace is published by Sine Wave Entertainment, a company based in London. The Chairman is Peter Norris, who is also Chairman of Virgin Group.

References 

2016 video games
Windows games
Video games with cross-platform play
Video games developed in the United Kingdom
Virtual reality games
HTC Vive games
Free-to-play video games
Virtual reality communities
Multiplayer and single-player video games
Massively multiplayer online games
Active massively multiplayer online games
First-person video games
Video games with user-generated gameplay content
Social casual games